Favartia parthi is a species of sea snail, a marine gastropod mollusk in the family Muricidae, the murex snails or rock snails.

Description

Distribution

References

 Houart, R., 1993. Three new species of Muricinae and Muricopsinae (Gastropoda: Muricidae) from Somalia, Christmas (Line Islands) and Philippines Islands. Venus 52(1): 41-46

External links
 MNHN, Paris: specimen

Muricidae
Gastropods described in 1993